Ceryx nacliodes is a moth of the  subfamily Arctiinae. It was described by George Hampson in 1914. It is found in Zimbabwe.

References

Endemic fauna of Zimbabwe
Ceryx (moth)
Moths described in 1914